The Golden Road may refer to:

 The Golden Road (1965–1973), a CD box set by the Grateful Dead named after a song, "The Golden Road (To Unlimited Devotion)"
 The Golden Road Music and Art Festival, an annual Grateful Dead festival in Louisville, KY.
 The Golden Road (Montgomery novel), a novel by Lucy Maud Montgomery
 The Golden Road, a 1972 novel by Hao Ran
 The Golden Road, an ancient track running along the ridge of the Preseli Hills in Pembrokeshire, Wales

See also
 Golden road (disambiguation)